U.S. Route 62 (US 62) is a U.S. highway running from El Paso, Texas northeast to Niagara Falls, New York. In the U.S. state of Arkansas, the route runs 329.9 miles from the Oklahoma border near Summers east to the Missouri border in St. Francis, serving the northern portion of the state. The route passes through several cities and towns, including Fayetteville, Springdale, Bentonville, Harrison, Mountain Home, Pocahontas, and also Piggott. US 62 runs concurrent with several highways in Arkansas including Interstate 49 and U.S. Route 71 between Fayetteville and Bentonville, U.S. Route 412 through much of the state, U.S. Route 65 in the Harrison area, and with U.S. Route 63 and U.S. Route 67 (Future Interstate 57) in northeast Arkansas.

Route description

Northwest Arkansas

U.S. Route 62 enters Arkansas from Oklahoma and runs by the Bean Cemetery near Lincoln and the Borden House and Prairie Grove Battlefield Park in Prairie Grove. The route then enters the Northwest Arkansas metro area, including the cities of Fayetteville, Rogers, and Bentonville. The route concurs with I-49/US 71 through these communities. In Benton County, the route passes Garfield Elementary School near the junction with Arkansas Highway 127 in Garfield before exiting Rogers. The route continues east near the Pea Ridge National Military Park and the Missouri state line before entering Carroll County.

The Ozark Mountains
US 62 winds through the Ozarks, passing through sparsely populated scenic country and small towns. US 62 passes the Thorncrown Chapel, the Tall Pines Motor Inn, and the historic U.S. 62 White River Bridge near Eureka Springs. The route begins a concurrency with U.S. Route 412 in Alpena that continues west to Imboden. Also, US 62/US 412 meet U.S. Route 65 in Harrison. In Marion County, the route meets US 62S in Pyatt and the US 62 Bridge over Crooked Creek outside of town. During this stretch, US 62 crosses two of the nine Arkansas Scenic Byways, the Pig Trail and Scenic Highway 7. Continuing east, the route passes a former alignment of US 62 before entering Yellville. East of Yellville, the route enters Mountain Home in Baxter County and crosses over Norfolk Lake to enter rural Fulton County. 

After passing through Fulton County, US 62/US 412 enters Sharp County. In Ash Flat, US 62/US 412 serves as the northern terminus of U.S. Route 167. After passing around Cherokee Village, Arkansas, the route enters Hardy. In Hardy, US 62/US 412/US 63 Business passes four properties on the National Register of Historic Places in Arkansas: the Carrie Tucker House, the Sherman Bates House, the Fred Graham House, and Web Long House and Motel. US 62/US 412 also meets U.S. Route 63, which is mostly a patchwork of concurrencies throughout the state. The routes continue together to Imboden, when US 63/US 412 break and continue south, where US 62/AR 115 continues over the St. Louis-San Francisco Overpass headed north into Randolph County and Crowley's Ridge.

Crowley's Ridge
In Randolph County, US 62 passes by cotton fields until Pocahontas, when the route meets US 67 (Future I-57). The route concurs with US 67 east until Corning in Clay County. The route runs east through Crowley's Ridge to Piggott, and enters Missouri near St. Francis.

History

The route was originally a trail known as the Ozark Trail, which was the main series of routes in the area prior to the construction of U.S. Route 66. The Ozark Trails Association was responsible for maintaining and marking the routes, with William Hope Harvey in charge. Harvey wanted an auto trail from Oklahoma to his resort town Monte Ne, which he established after retiring from the railroad business. He had grand visions of trails connecting Monte Ne with St. Louis, Kansas City, Wichita, Kansas, and Oklahoma City, and points west. U.S. Route 62 from Gateway to Eureka Springs was also designated part of The Jefferson Highway, although the highway was not really marked and frequently shifted.
The highway was listed as a "Proposed Primary Federal Aid Road" on a state map in the first issue of "Arkansas Highways Magazine" (1924), but not numbered.

The road brought much traffic through the hills of Arkansas, previously resistant to development. Eureka Springs was a popular stop on the route, with many motor inns and a vibrant downtown. Nearby Arkansas Highway 23 (The Pig Trail) further added tourists to the community. Further east, cities of Mountain Home, Cotter, and Flippin grew significantly with US 62's traffic. Rough terrain interspersed with large waterways caused the need for large bridges, including the Cotter Bridge (which replaced a ferry system) and the St. Louis-San Francisco Overpass. A 1981 study indicated a need of 31 climbing lanes from Harrison to Hardy (approx. ) necessary for safety purposes, indicative of the rough terrain.

Some historic alignments of the old road still exist with original pavement. One section, built between 1932 and bypassed in 1952, is located between Busch and Eureka Springs on either side of the White River.  On the north side of the river Carroll County Route 109 follows the alignment to the former river crossing, where only concrete bridge piers remain to be seen.  On the south side County Route 107 continues southward, eventually rejoining the modern alignment.  This section was listed on the National Register of Historic Places in 2008.

Major intersections

References

 Arkansas
62
Crowley's Ridge
Ozarks
Transportation in Washington County, Arkansas
Transportation in Benton County, Arkansas
Transportation in Carroll County, Arkansas
Transportation in Boone County, Arkansas
Transportation in Marion County, Arkansas
Transportation in Baxter County, Arkansas
Transportation in Fulton County, Arkansas
Transportation in Sharp County, Arkansas
Transportation in Lawrence County, Arkansas
Transportation in Randolph County, Arkansas
Transportation in Clay County, Arkansas
National Register of Historic Places in Carroll County, Arkansas
Roads on the National Register of Historic Places in Arkansas